Madonna and Child with Saints Elizabeth and John the Baptist is an oil on panel painting by Correggio, measuring 61 x 48 cm. It dates to around 1510 and is now in the Philadelphia Museum of Art.

References

1510 paintings
Paintings of the Madonna and Child by Correggio
Paintings in the collection of the Philadelphia Museum of Art
Paintings depicting John the Baptist
Paintings of Elizabeth (biblical figure)